The 2022–23 TFF First League will be the 22nd season since the league was established in 2001 and 60th season of the second-level football league of Turkey since its establishment in 1963–64.

Teams
Ankaragücü, Ümraniyespor and İstanbulspor promoted to 2022–23 Süper Lig.
Çaykur Rizespor, Altay, Göztepe and Yeni Malatyaspor relegated from 2021–22 Süper Lig.
Bodrumspor, Pendikspor and Sakaryaspor promoted from 2021–22 TFF Second League.
Kocaelispor, Bursaspor, Menemenspor and Balıkesirspor relegated to 2022–23 TFF Second League.
The bottom four teams will be relegated to the 2023–24 TFF Second League.

Stadiums and locations

Personnel and sponsorship

League table

Results

References

External links 
  Turkish Football Federation TFF 1. League

Turkey
TFF First League seasons
2022–23 in Turkish football
Current association football seasons